The Alay or Alai Range is a mountain range that extends from the Tien Shan mountain range in Kyrgyzstan west into Tajikistan. It is part of the Pamir-Alay mountain system. The range runs approximately east to west. Its highest summit is Pik Tandykul, reaching 5544 m. It forms the southern border of the Fergana Valley, and in the south it falls steeply to the Alay Valley. The southern slopes of the range drain into the Kyzylsuu or Vakhsh River, a tributary of the Amu Darya. The streams that drain the northern slopes of the range are tributaries of the Syr Darya, and empty into the Fergana Valley to the north of the range. Roads from Erkeshtam to Osh pass through these mountains.

Some imprecise sources seem to use the term for the whole southern curve of the Tian Shan corresponding to the southern border of Kyrgyzstan, to up north until the perpendicular extension known as Fergana Range, but strictly speaking the Alay Mountains are strictly north of Alay Valley, while confusingly, Trans-Alay Range of Pamir Mountains lies to the south of that valley, as well as Turkestan Range and Zarafshan Range at far southwest. Pamir-Alay is collective term for many systems above, but not including any of the Pamirs.

See also

 Mount Imeon
 Trans-Alay Range

References

Mountain ranges of Tajikistan
Mountain ranges of Kyrgyzstan